Osage Township is an inactive township in Cole County, in the U.S. state of Missouri.

Osage Township was named after the Osage River.

References

Townships in Missouri
Townships in Cole County, Missouri
Jefferson City metropolitan area